The second USS Chickasaw was a United States Navy tug in commission in 1898 and from 1900 to 1913.

Chickasaw was built in 1882 by John H. Dialogue and Sons at Camden, New Jersey, as the commercial tug Hercules. The U.S. Navy purchased Hercules on 25 June 1898 for use in the Spanish–American War and commissioned her as USS Chickasaw. She was in service briefly at Port Royal, South Carolina, and Charleston, South Carolina, before being decommissioned on 26 August 1898, two weeks after the end of the war. She was placed in ordinary for repairs.

In April 1900, Chickasaw was ordered to the New York Navy Yard in Brooklyn, New York, for use as a harbor tug and as a tender for the receiving ship .

In 1908, Chickasaw moved to Newport, Rhode Island, where she served as a harbor tug until 1913, when she returned to New York City and was sold.

References
 

Tugs of the United States Navy
Ships built by Dialogue & Company
1882 ships
Spanish–American War auxiliary ships of the United States